Jaiyk also known as Cayık or sometimes Jayık Khan, is the god of rivers in Tengrism. He is an important deity in folk beliefs.

Jaiyk was previously known as Dayık in Altai mythology. He was originally the patron god of humanity and son of Kayra, but later the influence of his cult spread throughout Central Asian cultures. He was the deity of rivers, water, and lake water. 

Jaiyk is depicted as a young man with a scourge in his hand. He lives at the junction of 17 rivers. Jaiyk has all the power of water and can make storms on the water. If he becomes angry, he makes and causes by floods on the Earth. All of the rivers and lakes are in the command of Jaiyk. He send spirits to all rivers. Every river or creek has an İye (protector spirit or deity). The Tengrist concept of the god seems to associate him both to the destructive and the purifier powers of water.

Rivers in folklore
According to ancient traditions and opinions, water and rivers are a sacred phenomenon and can purify all things. The people used to be obliged to respect the water in family or in social life. In the water sits and lives a protector spirit (familiar spirit). If he is angry, then he can be harmful to humans. Because of this disrespectful behavior, water may also become dry. Therefore, Tengrist writings and oral narratives tell cautionary tales and stories of irreverence to water. The Great Law of Genghis Khan (Yassa) has serious penalties when anyone pollutes water or rivers.

Etymology
Gerard Clauson (1972) traces Southwestern Turkic yayık "a churn; spread out; flood water" to root *yay- "'shaking' or the like, used metaph. for 'unstable, fickle'."

See also
Ural River, originally named Yayıq.

References

Notes

External links 
 Yayık Han
 Şamanizm
 Ak Yang (Ak Din) - Burhanizm
 Türk Folklorunda Ölüm, Özlem Ölmez 

Turkic deities
Sea and river gods
Water gods